The Pumpkin Eater is a 1964 British drama film starring Anne Bancroft as an unusually fertile woman and Peter Finch as her philandering husband. The film was adapted by Harold Pinter from the 1962 novel of the same title by Penelope Mortimer and was directed by Jack Clayton. The title is a reference to the nursery rhyme "Peter Peter Pumpkin Eater".

Plot 
The film's narrative revolves around Jo Armitage (Anne Bancroft), a woman with an ambiguous number of children from three marriages, who becomes negative and withdrawn after discovering that her third (and current) husband, Jake (Peter Finch), has been unfaithful to her. After a series of loosely related events in which Jake's infidelity is balanced by his reliability as a breadwinner and a father, Jo and Jake take a first tentative step toward reconciliation.

Thematically, there are two issues: Jo's frequent childbearing and Jake's extramarital affairs. The question of Jo's fertility is first broached by her psychiatrist. He suggests that she may feel uncomfortable with the messiness or vulgarity of sex and that she may be using childbirth to justify it to herself. This does not prevent her from becoming pregnant again, but she follows suggestions by Jake and her doctor that she have an abortion and be sterilized, and she seems happy after the operation.

Meanwhile, signs accumulate that Jake has been having affairs while pursuing a successful career as a screenwriter. The first indication of his infidelity concerns Philpot (Maggie Smith), a young woman who lived with the Armitage family for a while. Jake reacts irrationally and unconvincingly to Jo's questions after the children tell her the woman fainted into Jake's arms. The second sign comes from Bob Conway (James Mason), an acquaintance who alleges an affair between his wife and Jake during production of a film in Morocco. Finally, Jake admits some of his infidelities under heated interrogation by Jo. After venting her frustration by furiously assaulting him, she retaliates by having an affair with her second husband. This elicits coldness from Jake.

In the film's finale, Jo spends a night alone in a windmill (near the converted barn she had lived in with her second husband and children) that the couple has been renovating. The following morning, Jake and their children arrive at the windmill with food. Seeing how happy her children are with Jake, Jo indicates her acceptance of him by sadly, but graciously, accepting a tin of beer from him, a gesture which echoes another scene in the windmill from a happier time in their marriage.

Cast
 Anne Bancroft as Jo Armitage
 Peter Finch as Jake Armitage
 James Mason as Bob Conway
 Cedric Hardwicke as Mr James, Jo's father
 Richard Johnson as Giles
 Eric Porter as Psychiatrist
 Rosalind Atkinson as Mrs. James, Jo's mother
 Frances White as Older Dinah
 Alan Webb as Mr Armitage, Jake's father
 Cyril Luckham as Doctor
 Janine Gray as Beth Conway
 Yootha Joyce as Woman at hairdresser's
 Frank Singuineau as King of Israel
 Maggie Smith as Philpot

Reception
Time magazine wrote "Though Pumpkin Eater in outline resembles a compendium of womanly woes, it plays like a house afire, almost invariably ignited by actress Bancroft, who could probably strike dramatic lightning from a recitation of tide tables...And her spectacular scenes with Finch, pitched against the din of a more or less anonymous army of progeny, are a litany of love, hate, lies, jealousy and excruciating domestic boredom." Variety wrote "[Pinter's] script vividly brings to life the principal characters in this story of a shattered marriage, though Pinter's resort to flashback technique is confusing in the early stages. Jack Clayton's direction gets off to a slow, almost casual start, but the pace quickens as the drama becomes more intense. He has used the considerable acting talents at his command for the maximum results."

Bosley Crowther of The New York Times was critical of Pinter's script, and Clayton's direction, of which he felt was "somewhat mechanical, too, tumbling his drama in a confusion of jump cuts and fleeting images...With a good deal more body to the drama and point to the characters, Mr. Clayton would have a picture that comes close to representing truth." The Monthly Film Bulletin stated "There is something phantasmally absurd about this well-meaning, ambitious film...It could well be that Pinter's brilliance is altogether the wrong kind of brilliance to let loose on the scripting of this already nerve-raw, nightmarish subject. Jo...makes an eminently worthwhile, but virtually intractable, subject for a film: worthwhile because neurotics rarely get a square, sympathetic, penetrating deal in the cinema; intractable because, like many neurotics, she is a fixated and evidently crashing bore, and one of the most difficult things to do is to present a bore fairly without at the same time boring your audience too."

The film has continued to provoke comments. In a 1999 obituary of Penelope Mortimer, Giles Gordon in The Guardian characterized Harold Pinter as someone who values what is "written between the lines," making him "her ideal translator and interpreter" for the film adaptation of Mortimer's novel. In 2006, David Hare wrote that "Pinter regularly offers actors what will become the opportunities of a lifetime: to Meryl Streep, obviously, in The French Lieutenant's Woman; to Peter Finch and Anne Bancroft in one of the most over-looked of all British films, The Pumpkin Eater; and, unforgettably, to Dirk Bogarde, both in Accident and The Servant."

Awards and nominations

Home video
The Pumpkin Eater was released as a fullscreen DVD by Sony Pictures Home Entertainment on 4 March 2011. A Blu-ray edition was released by Powerhouse Films on 4 December 2017.

Notes

References

External links
 
 
 
 

1964 films
1964 drama films
Adultery in films
BAFTA winners (films)
British black-and-white films
British drama films
Columbia Pictures films
1960s English-language films
Films about abortion
Films about psychiatry
Films based on British novels
Films directed by Jack Clayton
Films featuring a Best Drama Actress Golden Globe-winning performance
Films scored by Georges Delerue
British pregnancy films
Films with screenplays by Harold Pinter
1960s pregnancy films
1960s British films